Harzand-e Atiq (also Romanized as Harzand-e ‘Atīq and Harzand ‘Atīq; also known as Harzān, Harzand, and Harzand Atigh) is a village in Harzandat-e Sharqi Rural District, in the Central District of Marand County, East Azerbaijan Province, Iran. At the 2006 census, its population was 603, in 163 families.

References 

Populated places in Marand County